Duncan MacEwan is a Scottish retired footballer who played professionally in the Major Indoor Soccer League, American Indoor Soccer Association and third American Soccer League.

Career
MacEwan attended Penn State University where he was a 1980 Honorable Mention (third team) All American and 1981 Second Team All American.  In 1981, the Denver Avalanche selected MacEwan in the Major Indoor Soccer League draft.  In 1983, he signed with the
St. Louis Steamers where he played three seasons.  In 1986, he moved to the Tampa Bay Rowdies of the American Indoor Soccer Association.  He returned to MISL in September 1987 with the Kansas City Comets.   In 1989, he played for the Tampa Bay Rowdies of the American Soccer League.

References

External links
MISL stats

1958 births
Living people
American Indoor Soccer Association players
American Soccer League (1988–89) players
Denver Avalanche players
Kansas City Comets (original MISL) players
Major Indoor Soccer League (1978–1992) players
Penn State Nittany Lions men's soccer players
Scottish footballers
Scottish expatriate footballers
St. Louis Steamers (original MISL) players
Tampa Bay Rowdies (1975–1993) players
Association football forwards
Scottish expatriate sportspeople in the United States
Expatriate soccer players in the United States